Originally set to compete as The Independent Asian Athletes, alternatively as the Independent Olympic Athletes, the Kuwaitis are allowed to compete under their own flags just two days before the opening of the 2018 Asian Games in Jakarta and Palembang, Indonesia from 18 August to 2 September 2018.

Medalists

The following Kuwait competitors won medals at the Games.

Athletics 

Kuwait entered two men's athletes to participate in the athletics competition at the Games.

Equestrian 

Kuwait entered four riders (2 men's and 2 women's) competing in the equestrian show jumping event.
Jumping

# – indicates that the score of this rider does not count in the team competition, since only the best three results of a team are counted.

Fencing 

Individual

Ju-jitsu 

Kuwait entered the ju-jitsu competition with 4 men's athletes.

Men

Karate 

Kuwait participated in the karate competition at the Games with four men's athletes.

Kurash 

Men

Paragliding 

Men

Rowing

Shooting 

Men

Women

Mixed team

Squash 

Singles

Swimming 

Men

Triathlon 

Individual

See also 
 Kuwait at the 2018 Asian Para Games

References

2018 in Kuwaiti sport
Nations at the 2018 Asian Games
2018